Sonic Rivers is a collaborative studio album by trombonist George Lewis, trumpeter Wadada Leo Smith, and saxophonist John Zorn. It was released in June 2014 by Tzadik Records.

Reception
A reviewer of Soundohm stated "Tzadik introduces its new Spectrum series with a very special and exciting new group featuring three of the most creative wind players in new music. Friends and colleagues since the ’70s, these three musicians share a vision of improvisation and composition that is unique, virtuosic and cooperative. Performing compositions and collective improvisations, they sculpt sound and silence with masterly assurance. Surprising yet completely inevitable, this is an essential document of improvisational music in the 21st century by three contemporary masters."

Track listing
"Cecil Taylor" (Wadada Leo Smith) – 8:57
"The Art of Counterpoint" (George Lewis, Smith, John Zorn) – 3:50
"North" (Lewis, Smith, Zorn) – 7:14
"South" (Lewis, Smith, Zorn) – 5:44
"East" (Lewis, Smith, Zorn) – 4:05
"West" (Lewis, Smith, Zorn) – 3:55
"Screaming Grass" (Lewis, Smith, Zorn) – 5:49
"The Culture of Gun Violence in the US" (Smith) – 5:43

Personnel
George Lewis – trombone, electronics
Wadada Leo Smith – trumpet
John Zorn – alto saxophone

References

2014 albums
John Zorn albums
Albums produced by John Zorn
Tzadik Records albums